The 2022 UNCAF U-19 Tournament, also known as UNCAF FIFA FORWARD Men's U-19 Tournament, was the second edition of the UNCAF U-19 Tournament, the biennial international youth football tournament organised by the Central American Football Union (UNCAF) for the men's under-19 national teams of the Central America region. It was held in Belmopan, Belize between 24 and 30 April 2022.

Guatemala were the defending champions having won the title in 2018, but was unable to retain the title and finished in sixth place. Costa Rica won their first tournament title after beating El Salvador by a 5–4 score in the final.

Entrants
All seven UNCAF member national teams entered the tournament in addition to Puerto Rico which participated as a guest from the Caribbean Football Union (CFU).

Venues

Belize was named as host country of the tournament at the XX UNCAF Ordinary Congress meeting held on 2 December 2021. The Isidoro Beaton and FFB stadiums, both located in Belmopan, hosted the matches.

Composition of the groups
The groups and match schedule were revealed on 7 April 2022. No previous draw was announced, however the hosts Belize and the title holders Guatemala were seeded and assigned to the head of the groups A and B respectively.

The groups were conformed as follows:

Match officials
On 23 April 2022, UNCAF announced a total of 10 referees and 10 assistant referees appointed for the tournament.

Group stage
All match times are in CST (UTC−6), as listed by UNCAF.

Group A

Group B

Knockout stage
All match times are in CST (UTC−6), as listed by UNCAF.

Seventh place match

Fifth place match

Third place match

Final

Goalscorers

Final ranking
Per statistical convention in football, matches decided in extra time were counted as wins and losses, while matches decided by penalty shoot-out were counted as draws.

References

2022
2022 in youth association football
2022